The Gugyedong Formation, also known as the Guyedong Beds, is an Aptian to Albian geologic formation in South Korea. Dinosaur remains diagnostic to the genus level are among the fossils that have been recovered from the formation.

Fossil content 
The following fossils have been reported from the formation:
Reptiles
 Ultrasaurus tabriensis 
 Dromaeosauridae indet. (="Koreanosaurus koreanensis")
 Sauropoda indet.
 Testudines indet.
Flora
 Pseudofrenelopsis parceramosa

See also 
 List of dinosaur-bearing rock formations
 List of stratigraphic units with few dinosaur genera
 Hasandong Formation
 Jinju Formation

References

Bibliography 

 
  
 

Geologic formations of South Korea
Cretaceous South Korea
Lower Cretaceous Series of Asia
Albian Stage
Aptian Stage
Conglomerate formations
Siltstone formations
Fluvial deposits
Paleontology in South Korea